Quaise Khademi, born (3 September 1994) better known as Kaisy Khademi, is an Afghanistan-born British professional boxer who challenged for the British super-flyweight title in 2021.

Early life
Quaise Khademi was born on 3 September 1994 in Kabul, Afghanistan. He fled Afghanistan with members of his extended family from persecution by the Taliban. On their third attempt, the Khademi family made it to England in 2002 after hiding in a truck en route from the Port of Calais, France, to the Port of Dover. After a brief detention by the British authorities, he was initially housed in Dalston, before moving to Walthamstow. He gained asylum nine years after arriving in England.

Professional career
Khademi made his professional debut on 14 November 2017, scoring a four-round points decision (PTS) victory over Reiss Taylor at the York Hall in London.

After compiling a record of 7–0 (2 KOs) he defeated Pedro Matos on 14 December 2019, capturing the vacant WBO European junior-bantamweight title via ten-round unanimous decision (UD) with the scorecards reading 96–93, 96–94 and 95–94.

Professional boxing record

References

Living people
Date of birth missing (living people)
British male boxers
Afghan male boxers
Afghan emigrants to England
Sportspeople from Kabul
Super-flyweight boxers
1994 births